Agrotis buchholzi, or Buchholz's dart moth, is a species of cutworm or dart moth in the family Noctuidae. It was first described by William Barnes and Foster Hendrickson Benjamin in 1929 and it is found in North America.

The MONA or Hodges number for Agrotis buchholzi is 10654.

References

Further reading

 
 
 

Agrotis
Articles created by Qbugbot
Moths described in 1929